Digitaria iburua, commonly known as iburu, is a grass species native to west and west-central tropical Africa, which is cultivated as a grain crop known as black fonio.

Iburu (D. iburua) is closely related to white fonio (D. exilis), a cereal that is more widely grown across West Africa. However, Iburu is taller than fonio, but has smaller grain than fonio. This makes harvesting the grains very labor-intensive. Iburu is mainly grown in the Middle Belt of central Nigeria, as well as in Zinder, Niger.

See also
Digitaria compacta, raishan, used as a grain crop in northeast India
Digitaria exilis, white fonio, also used as a grain crop in West Africa
Digitaria longiflora, the wild progenitor of Digitaria exilis
Digitaria sanguinalis, considered a weed around the world, but traditionally used as a grain crop in Europe

References

iburua
Grasses of Africa
Flora of West-Central Tropical Africa
Cereals